Uthina is a genus of cellar spiders that was first described by Eugène Louis Simon in 1893.

Species
 it contains seventeen species, found only in Africa, Asia, and Australia:
Uthina huahinensis Yao & Li, 2016 – Thailand
Uthina huifengi Yao & Li, 2016 – Thailand, Malaysia, Indonesia (Sumatra)
Uthina hylobatea Huber, Caspar & Eberle, 2019 – Indonesia (Bali, Java)
Uthina javaensis Yao & Li, 2016 – Indonesia (Java)
Uthina khaosokensis Yao, Li & Jäger, 2014 – Thailand
Uthina luzonica Simon, 1893 (type) – Sri Lanka, Thailand, Malaysia, Indonesia, Philippines, northern Australia, Pacific Is. Introduced to Seychelles, Réunion, Taiwan
Uthina maya Huber, Caspar & Eberle, 2019 – Indonesia (Bali)
Uthina mimpi Huber, Caspar & Eberle, 2019 – Indonesia (Sulawesi)
Uthina muangensis Yao & Li, 2016 – Thailand
Uthina potharamensis Yao & Li, 2016 – Thailand
Uthina ratchaburi Huber, 2011 – Thailand
Uthina saiyokensis Yao & Li, 2016 – Thailand
Uthina sarikaensis Yao & Li, 2016 – Thailand
Uthina sulawesiensis Yao & Li, 2016 – Indonesia (Sulawesi, Ternate)
Uthina wongpromi Yao & Li, 2016 – Thailand
Uthina yunchuni Yao & Li, 2016 – Thailand
Uthina zhigangi Yao & Li, 2016 – Thailand

See also
 List of Pholcidae species

References

Araneomorphae genera
Pholcidae
Spiders of Asia
Spiders of Oceania